Pultenaea rigida is a species of flowering plant in the family Fabaceae and is endemic to south-eastern South Australia. It is a rigid, erect to prostrate, much-branched shrub with lance-shaped, sharply-pointed leaves and yellow and red to purplish flowers.

Description

Taxonomy
Pultenaea rigida was first formally described in 1864 by George Bentham in Flora Australiensis from specimens collected by Robert Brown at Memory Cove.

Distribution and habitat
This species of Pultenaea grows in forest, mallee, heathland or on dunes and headlands and is common on the Mount Lofty Ranges, Yorke and Eyre Peninsulas and on Kangaroo Island.

References

Fabales of Australia
Flora of South Australia
rigida
Plants described in 1864
Taxa named by George Bentham